The 1963 Estonian SSR Football Championship was won by Tempo.

League table

References

Estonian Football Championship
Est
Football